Women's Giant Slalom World Cup 2002/2003

Final point standings

In Women's Giant Slalom World Cup 2002/03 all results count.

Note:

In the last race only the best racers were allowed to compete and only the best 15 finishers were awarded with points.

References
 fis-ski.com

World Cup
FIS Alpine Ski World Cup women's giant slalom discipline titles